The Newman Institute is a charitable organisation working in conjunction with the Diocese of Killala in the west of Ireland. A core aim of the Newman Institute is to provide an opportunity for people to learn more about their faith through accredited and non-accredited faith formation courses. It is hoped that the Newman Institute will be able to play its part in addressing the ongoing need for Adult Religious Education and Faith Formation in the Diocese of Killala and beyond.

In October 2010 the Newman Institute's adult education and faith formation centre was officially opened by President Mary McAleese.

The Institute offers a Diploma in Applied Theology in association with St. Angelas College, Sligo and is accredited by the National University of Ireland, Galway.

The BA Theology and Community Involvement (Level 8) similarly in association with St. Angela's and NUIG was launched in 2010.

November 2015, seen the first six Newman Institute students graduate with degrees from St. Angela's College, Sligo, awarded by National University of Ireland Galway.

The institutes facilities are used by a variety of groups, such as Toastmasters, Order of Malta, Mayo Stroke Support Group, General Humbert Summer School among others.

References

External links
 Facebook Page
 Killala Diocese Courses

Ballina, County Mayo
Catholic charities
Charities based in Ireland
Catholic educational institutions
Catholic organizations established in the 20th century
1998 establishments in Ireland